Bootle Oriel Road railway station is a railway station in Bootle, Merseyside, England. It is situated near the town's Victorian civic centre, opposite Bootle Town Hall, although the surrounding area is now largely residential. It is located on the Northern Line of the Merseyrail network.

History
Bootle Village Station (on south side of Merton Road) opened in 1850 as an intermediate station when the Liverpool, Crosby and Southport Railway was extended from its previous terminal at Waterloo to Liverpool Exchange. A new station called Bootle Oriel Road (further south from Merton Road) was opened on 1 May 1876 and replaced Bootle Village Station. It became part of the Lancashire and Yorkshire Railway (LYR), on 14 June 1855. The Lancashire and Yorkshire Railway amalgamated with the London and North Western Railway on 1 January 1922 and in turn was Grouped into the London, Midland and Scottish Railway in 1923. Nationalisation followed in 1948 and in 1978 the station became part of the Merseyrail network's Northern Line (operated by British Rail until privatised in 1995).

Facilities
There is a booking office where staff are available 15 minutes before the first train until 15 minutes after the last train. Both platforms can be accessed via ramps or lifts. There is car parking for 4 cars and secure cycle storage for 24 cycles, plus toilets and a payphone.  Train running information is provided via automated announcements, digital CIS displays, customer help points on each platform and timetable posters.

Services
Trains operate every 15 minutes throughout the day from Monday to Saturday and on summer Sundays to Southport to the north, and to Hunts Cross via Liverpool Central to the south. Winter Sunday services are every 30 minutes in each direction.

Gallery

References

External links

Railway stations in the Metropolitan Borough of Sefton
DfT Category E stations
Former Lancashire and Yorkshire Railway stations
Railway stations in Great Britain opened in 1850
Railway stations served by Merseyrail
Bootle